Luda is a rural locality (a village) in Pertominskoye Rural Settlement of Primorsky District, Arkhangelsk Oblast, Russia. The population was 74 as of 2010.

Geography 
Luda is located on the Luda River, 154 km west of Arkhangelsk (the district's administrative centre) by road. Una is the nearest rural locality.

References 

Rural localities in Primorsky District, Arkhangelsk Oblast
Arkhangelsky Uyezd